"Welcome Home, Baby" is a song written by Luther Dixon and performed by The Shirelles.  The song reached #20 on the R&B chart and #22 on the Billboard Hot 100 in 1962.  It was featured on their 1962 album, The Shirelles and King Curtis Give a Twist Party.

The song was arranged by Bert Keyes.

The single's B-side, "Mama, Here Comes the Bride", reached #104 on the Billboard chart.

References

1962 songs
1962 singles
Songs written by Luther Dixon
The Shirelles songs
Scepter Records singles